The 2015 U.S. Men's Clay Court Championships (also known as the Fayez Sarofim & Co. U.S. Men's Clay Court Championships for sponsorship purposes) was a tennis tournament played on outdoor clay courts. It was the 47th edition of the U.S. Men's Clay Court Championships, and an ATP World Tour 250 event on the 2015 ATP World Tour. It took place at River Oaks Country Club in Houston, Texas, United States, from April 6 through April 12, 2015.

Singles main draw entrants

Seeds

Rankings are as of March 23, 2015.

Other entrants
The following players received wildcards into the main draw:
  Lleyton Hewitt
  Feliciano López
  Janko Tipsarević

The following players received entry via the qualifying draw:
  Facundo Argüello
  Chung Hyeon
  Guilherme Clezar
  Rogério Dutra Silva

Withdrawals
Before the tournament
  Gaël Monfils →replaced by Go Soeda
  Bernard Tomic →replaced by Tim Smyczek

Retirements
  Paolo Lorenzi
  Marinko Matosevic (left foot injury)

Doubles main draw entrants

Seeds

 Rankings are as of March 23, 2015.

Other entrants
The following pair received wildcards into the doubles main draw:
  Lleyton Hewitt /  Matt Reid
  Philipp Petzschner /  Janko Tipsarević
The following pairs received entry as alternates:
  Ričardas Berankis /  Teymuraz Gabashvili
  Somdev Devvarman /  Sanam Singh

Withdrawals
Before the tournament
  Ryan Harrison (right hip injury)
  Marinko Matosevic (left foot injury)

Retirements
  Santiago González (right hamstring injury)

Finals

Singles

  Jack Sock defeated  Sam Querrey, 7–6(11–9), 7–6(7–2)

Doubles

  Ričardas Berankis /  Teymuraz Gabashvili defeated  Treat Huey /  Scott Lipsky, 6–4, 6–4

References

External links

Official website